Ryan Duane Brett (born October 9, 1991) is an American former professional baseball second baseman. He made his Major League Baseball (MLB) debut with the Tampa Bay Rays in 2015.

Career

Tampa Bay Rays
Brett attended Highline High School in Burien, Washington. He was drafted by the Tampa Bay Rays in the third round of the 2010 Major League Baseball Draft. Brett made his professional debut that season for the Gulf Coast Rays. He played 2011 with the Princeton Rays and started 2012 with the Bowling Green Hot Rods. In August 2012, Brett along with two other Rays minor leaguers were suspended 50 games for testing positive for methamphetamine. He returned in 2013 and started the season with the Charlotte Stone Crabs. After hitting .340 he was promoted to the Montgomery Biscuits. He returned to Montgomery in 2014.

The Rays promoted Brett to the major leagues on April 18, 2015. He was non tendered on December 2, 2015. Brett missed the entire 2016 season with an elbow injury, and signed a minor league contract with the Rays on December 14, 2016. He elected free agency on November 6, 2017.

Texas Rangers
On January 10, 2018, Brett signed a minor league contract with the Texas Rangers. He was released on March 6, 2018.

Chicago White Sox
On March 9, 2018, Brett signed a minor league contract with the Chicago White Sox. He was released on August 1, 2018.

Kansas City T-Bones
On August 6, Brett signed with the Kansas City T-Bones of the independent American Association. He was released on March 7, 2019. However, he later re-signed with T-Bones on March 15, 2019. Brett was later released again on June 22, 2019.

Cleburne Railroaders
On June 25, 2019, Brett signed with the Cleburne Railroaders of the American Association of Independent Professional Baseball.

Sioux Falls Canaries
On January 13, 2020, Brett was traded to the Sioux Falls Canaries of the American Association. On January 20, 2021, Brett was released by the Canaries.

References

External links

1991 births
Living people
Baseball players from Seattle
Birmingham Barons players
Bowling Green Hot Rods players
Charlotte Knights players
Charlotte Stone Crabs players
Cleburne Railroaders players
Durham Bulls players
Gulf Coast Rays players
Highline High School alumni
Kansas City T-Bones players
Major League Baseball second basemen
Montgomery Biscuits players
People from Burien, Washington
Princeton Rays players
Salt River Rafters players
Sioux Falls Canaries players
Tampa Bay Rays players